Koruköy can refer to:

 Koruköy, Adıyaman
 Koruköy, Dicle
 Koruköy, Elâzığ
 Koruköy, Gelibolu
 Koruköy, Kastamonu
 Koruköy, Yenice